Arkansas Highway 266 (AR 266 and Hwy. 266) is an east–west state highway in Faulkner County, Arkansas. The route of  runs from U.S. Route 65 Business and U.S. Route 64 in Conway east to Siebenmorgen Road.

Route description
Located entirely in Faulkner County, its west terminus was at an intersection with U.S. Route 65 Business and U.S. Route 64 in Conway at a roundabout near the entrance to Hendrix College. The route then proceeds east before ending at the Arkansas Human Development Center and continuing on as Siebenmorgen Road.

Major intersections

References

266
Transportation in Faulkner County, Arkansas
Conway, Arkansas
State highways in the United States shorter than one mile